The 2015 CIS Women's Final 8 Basketball Tournament was held March 12–15, 2015, in Quebec City, Quebec. It was hosted by Université Laval at the PEPS Gymnasium, marking the fourth time Laval has hosted, and the fourth time the tournament has been played in Quebec City.

Participating Teams

Championship Bracket

Consolation Bracket

See also 
2015 CIS Men's Basketball Championship

References

External links 
 Tournament Web Site

U Sports Women's Basketball Championship
2014–15 in Canadian basketball
2015 in women's basketball